Golden Mile is a surface light rail transit (LRT) stop under construction on Line 5 Eglinton, a new line that is part of the Toronto subway system. It will be located in the Golden Mile neighbourhood at the intersection of Eglinton Avenue and Warden Avenue. It is scheduled to open in 2023.

The stop is located in the middle of Eglinton Avenue East at its intersection with Warden Avenue. The stop has far-side platforms with access to each platform from the adjacent north/south pedestrian crossing at the signalized intersection. This staggered configuration means the westbound platform will be located west of the intersection, and the eastbound platform will be situated east of the intersection.

During the planning stages for Line 5 Eglinton, the station was given the working name "Warden" the same as for the pre-existing Warden station on Line 2 Bloor–Danforth. On November 23, 2015, a report to the TTC Board recommended giving a unique name to each station in the subway system (including Line 5 Eglinton). Thus, this stop was renamed to "Golden Mile" after the neighbourhood where it is located. Note that three other stops west of this stop are also in the Golden Mile neighbourhood: O'Connor, Pharmacy and Hakimi Lebovic.

Surface connections 

, the following are the proposed connecting routes that would serve this station when Line 5 Eglinton opens:

References

External links

Line 5 Eglinton stations